Shane Robert van Gisbergen (born 9 May 1989) is a New Zealand racing driver in the Supercars Championship racing in the Number 97 Chevrolet Camaro ZL1 car for Triple Eight Race Engineering. With three Supercars Championship wins (2016, 2021, 2022), 75 wins and 40 pole positions, Van Gisbergen is the fourth most successful racing driver in the Supercars Championship history. He has won the Bathurst 1000 twice in 2020 and 2022, both times alongside Garth Tander.

Away from the Supercars Championship, Van Gisbergen has forged a successful  GT Racing career, winning the 2016 Liqui Moly Bathurst 12 Hour alongside Alvaro Parente and Jonathon Webb in the McLaren 650S GT3, winning the 2016 Blancpain GT Series Endurance Cup, finishing 3rd overall in the 2016 Intercontinental GT Challenge and finishing in second place in the 2015 24 Hours of Daytona in the GTD class.

He and Paul Morris are the only drivers to have won all three major car racing events at Mount Panorama; the Bathurst 1000, Bathurst 6 Hour and Bathurst 12 Hour.

New Zealand racing history
After competing in Motocross, Quarter Midgets and karts from 1998 to 2004, van Gisbergen placed third in the 2004/2005 New Zealand Formula First Championship and won the associated Rookie of the Year award. Van Gisbergen had previously obtained a Speedsport Star of Tomorrow Scholarship. A win in 2005/06 New Zealand Formula Ford Championship was accompanied by another Rookie of the Year title and was followed by a second-place finish in 2006/07 Toyota Racing Series.

In 2014, van Gisbergen co-drove to the BNT NZ Supertourers Hankook Super Series championship with primary driver Simon Evans. Shane won 7 of the 9 races in a total of the Endurance rounds including sweeping the entire Fuchs 500 weekend at Pukekohe Park Raceway with winning race #3 in spectacular fashion driving from 1 lap down.
In 2021, van Gisbergen won the New Zealand Grand Prix held as part of the Toyota Racing Series. The event is normally held for a global field however was restricted to a New Zealand-only field due to the COVID-19 pandemic, with van Gisbergen entering as a wildcard.

Supercars championship

Van Gisbergen became the 200th driver to start a race in a V8 Supercar at the Jim Beam 400 at Oran Park Raceway in Round 8 of 2007. Driving for Team Kiwi Racing, van Gisbergen finished the first race in 20th position before improving to 13th for race 2 but then dropped down to 23rd in race 3. Having impressed in his 2007 races, van Gisbergen was picked up by Stone Brothers Racing in 2008. He would continue with the team for five seasons until 2012, securing a best of fourth in the championship in 2011. In late 2012, he announced he would be leaving V8 Supercars but in January it emerged that he was moving to Tekno Autosports at the start of the 2013 season. The move to Tekno proved fruitful, with van Gisbergen finishing runner-up in the championship in 2014.

Van Gisbergen has also shown a strong pace at the series' most famous race, the Bathurst 1000. He was in the lead in the 2009 Bathurst 1000 until pitting on lap 108 when his car would not start, resulting in a 1:14 pit stop and losing him a number of positions in the race. A near-identical issue repeated itself in the 2014 edition, where with 10 laps to go – he stalled and the starter motor failed, costing him almost a certain victory and he finished 16th. Van Gisbergen had started the 2014 race from pole position, his first at the event.

In 2016, van Gisbergen moved to the successful Triple Eight Race Engineering team, alongside two of the most successful drivers in series history; Jamie Whincup and Craig Lowndes. Van Gisbergen won his first race for the team at the Tasmania SuperSprint in 2016, which was also Holden's 500th win in championship history. Alexandre Prémat joined van Gisbergen as co-driver in the Enduro Cup. The pairing went on to win the 2016 Enduro Cup, including three second-place finishes and Prémat's first race victory in the championship at the 2016 Castrol Gold Coast 600 and become the first non-Australian drivers combination to win. At Pukekohe, van Gisbergen became the first New Zealander to lift the trophy, named in honour of Jason Richards, who died of cancer in 2011 and he admitted the occasion got the better of him after crossing the finish line. He went on to win 8 races that season on the way to clinching the championship with a race to spare.

In 2017, Whincup and van Gisbergen joined again under the Red Bull Holden Racing Team banner. At Adelaide, he started his title defence with a commanding double-victory, and remained in contention during the campaign but he finished 4th in the championship. In 2018, van Gisbergen won both Race 1 and Race 2 at the Adelaide, driving a Holden Commodore ZB. At Townsville, van Gisbergen won at race 18 after Whincup marked the 10th running at race 17. On 4 August, van Gisbergen won the Sydney SuperNight 300, the championship's first night race in 21 years, after a Safety Car ignited a thrilling final stint battle between Scott McLaughlin and the three Triple Eight Holdens. At Tailem Bend, van Gisbergen dominated the inaugural race at The Bend Motorsport Park, taking a near lights-to-flag win in Race 22. On 16 September, at Sandown, Van Gisbergen finished 2nd alongside Earl Bamber, who is a double Le Mans 24 Hours winner. Van Gisbergen managed to controversially escape a penalty for spinning his wheels during a pit stop at the Auckland SuperSprint at Pukekohe.

At Newcastle, van Gisbergen was handed a 25-second post-race penalty, which saw his Saturday win in Newcastle stripped. Stewards confirmed the time penalty on Sunday morning following Saturday night's investigation into an alleged refueling breach at his third pitstop, which was taken under the safety car and dropping to fifth in the race result. Scott McLaughlin was declared the winner of the race. Van Gisbergen finished second at race 31 and in the points standings.

In 2020, during the COVID-19 pandemic plagued Supercars season, he won the Bathurst 1000 with Garth Tander in what would be the final race for Holden after the manufacturer was closed by GM, marking the end of a historic period of Australian Motorsport.

GT racing

Through his connections with Tekno Autosports sponsor Tony Quinn, van Gisbergen's first foray into GT racing was a guest co-drive in Quinn's team in the 2013 Australian GT Championship. In 2014, he entered both the 24 Hours of Daytona and the Bathurst 12 Hour for the first time, the latter again in partnership with Quinn, this time in a McLaren. His Daytona entry was with Alex Job Racing, where he finished 26th overall and sixth in the GTD class. He returned to Daytona in 2015 and 2016 with the team.

Having impressed in previous outings, in 2015 he entered the Blancpain Endurance Series in a McLaren 650S GT3 run by Von Ryan Racing. Racing in conjunction with his V8 Supercars commitments, he was forced to miss one round due to a date clash, however achieved two victories in the four races he entered. The team was dissolved after the 2015 season, and for the 2016 season, van Gisbergen moved to McLaren's new Garage 59 team. He will once again miss the final round of the championship at the Nürburgring in Germany due to the Sandown 500 V8 Supercar race being held on the same weekend. Van Gisbergen won the 2016 season with Côme Ledogar and Rob Bell having won the 3 Hours of Monza and the 1000 km Paul Ricard despite skipping the last round at the Nürburgring due to a clash with his Supercars Championship commitments.

Through his McLaren and Tekno Autosports connections, he drove one of Tekno's factory-supported McLaren 650S GT3s at the 2016 Bathurst 12 Hour. In qualifying on Saturday, van Gisbergen set the fastest ever officially recorded lap of the Mount Panorama Circuit to achieve pole position. He went on to set the fastest ever race lap on the way to securing victory alongside Álvaro Parente and Jonathon Webb.

Career results

Touring Cars

Supercars Championship results
(Races in bold indicate pole position) (Races in italics indicate fastest lap)

Complete Bathurst 1000 results

Complete V8 SuperTourer results

Sports/GT Cars

Complete Bathurst 12 Hour results

Complete Blancpain GT Series Endurance Cup results

Complete IMSA SportsCar Championship results

Complete 24 Hours of Daytona results

Complete Spa 24 Hours results

Complete Intercontinental GT Challenge Series results
(key) (Races in bold indicate pole position) (Races in italics indicate fastest lap)

Complete 12 Hours of Sebring results

Complete 24 Hours of Le Mans results

Rally

World Rally Championship results

World Rally Championship-2 results

References

External links

 Official Website
 Profile on Driver DataBase
 Profile on US Racing Reference
 Photo's, articles & Video's on Motorsport.Com

1989 births
Living people
New Zealand speedway (auto racing) drivers
New Zealand people of Dutch descent
New Zealand racing drivers
Toyota Racing Series drivers
Sportspeople from Auckland
People educated at Saint Kentigern College
V8SuperTourer drivers
Supercars Championship drivers
24 Hours of Daytona drivers
WeatherTech SportsCar Championship drivers
Blancpain Endurance Series drivers
24 Hours of Spa drivers
Bathurst 1000 winners
24 Hours of Le Mans drivers
M2 Competition drivers
Asian Le Mans Series drivers
Eurasia Motorsport drivers
Australian Endurance Championship drivers
Stone Brothers Racing drivers
Mercedes-AMG Motorsport drivers
World Rally Championship drivers
New Zealand rally drivers
McLaren Racing drivers